The list of Tulu films that are scheduled to be released in 2019.

Releases

January – June

July – Dec

See also
List of Tulu films of 2020
List of Tulu films of 2018
List of Tulu films of 2017
List of Tulu films of 2016
List of Tulu films of 2015
List of Tulu films of 2014
List of Released Tulu films
Tulu cinema
 Tulu Movie Actors
 Tulu Movie Actresses
Karnataka State Film Award for Best Regional film
RED FM Tulu Film Awards

Read as
TBA* - To be announced.
TBC* - To be confirmed.
TBD* - To be determined.

References
News Related Tulu Film: 
 Mangaluru: Coastalwood and K Sooraj Shetty verses Mayur R Shetty
 Mangaluru: Appe Teacher

Tulu
Tulu-language films
Tulu